The 1976 Agfa Colour Cup was a men's Grand Prix tennis circuit tournament held in Düsseldorf, West Germany and played on outdoor clay courts. It was the seventh edition of the tournament and was held from 24 May until 30 May 1976. First-seeded Björn Borg won the singles title.

Finals

Singles
 Björn Borg defeated  Manuel Orantes 6–2, 6–2, 6–0
 It was Borg's 4th singles title of the year and the 17th of his career.

Doubles
 Wojciech Fibak /  Karl Meiler defeated  Bob Carmichael /  Ray Moore 6–4, 4–6, 6–4

References

Düsseldorf Grand Prix
1976 in West German sport